Django the Bastard is a 1969 Italian gothic horror Spaghetti Western film directed by Sergio Garrone who co-wrote the film with the star Anthony Steffen. In 1974 Herman Cohen released an edited American version of the film called The Stranger's Gundown.

Plot 
A mysterious, vengeful stranger rides into town and creates all sorts of havoc. It seems there are a number of people on his list and before he metes out justice to each one, he places a cross with that person's name on it in the middle of the street. The burning question becomes whether these people are dealing with a one-man army of flesh and blood or an avenging angel of death. The answer may lie in the betrayal and massacre of a Confederate Army unit during the Civil War...

Cast 
Anthony Steffen - Django
Paolo Gozlino - Rod Murdok
Lu Kamante - Jack Murdock
Rada Rassimov - Alida Murdock
Teodoro Corrà - Williams
Jean Louis - Howard Ross
Fred Robsahm - Sam Hawkins
Ennio Balbo - Storekeeper

Release
Django the Bastard was first released in 1969.

VCI Entertainment released the English dubbed version on DVD during 2002 in both full and widescreen formats under its U.S. title The Strangers Gundown. This product is currently out of print (OOP).

The film was re-released September 18, 2015 in the United States under its original title Django il Bastardo from RetroVision Entertainment, LLC as a double bill with Boot Hill. It features both English and Italian dubs.

See also 
 Django (character)
 List of Italian films of 1969

References

Sources

External links

1960s Italian films
1960s Western (genre) horror films
1969 Western (genre) films
Gothic horror films 
Italian Western (genre) horror films
Spaghetti Western films